Giorgio Giacomelli (25 January 1930, in Milan – 8 February 2017, in Rome) was an Italian diplomat who represented Italy as ambassador to Somalia and Syria and was UNRWA's Commissioner-General from 1985 to 1991.

Biography
Giacomelli was the Italian Ambassador to Somalia from 1973 to 1976 and Ambassador to Syria from 1976 to 1980. In 1981 he became Director-General for Emigration and Social Affairs in the Ministry of Foreign Affairs, and then, until October 1985, Director–General of the Department of Cooperation and Development. From 1985 to 1991 he was Commissioner-General of UNWRA. Giacomelli left UNRWA when he was appointed by UN Secretary-General Javier Pérez de Cuéllar to become head of the UN's anti-drug campaign.

Honors
 Order of Merit of the Italian Republic 1st Class / Knight Grand Cross – 27 December 1993

See also
 List of Directors and Commissioners-General of the United Nations Relief and Works Agency for Palestine Refugees in the Near East
 Ministry of Foreign Affairs (Italy)
 Foreign relations of Italy

References

1930 births
2017 deaths
Ambassadors of Italy to Syria
Ambassadors of Italy to Somalia
Italian diplomats
UNRWA officials
Italian officials of the United Nations
Knights Grand Cross of the Order of Merit of the Italian Republic